Civil Society Coordination 2.0 refers to the strong coordination achieved through the online Virtual community and the Web 2.0 phenomenon over the World Wide Web; Civil Society Coordination 2.0 basically refers to the new organizational strengths the Internet has afforded to the 21st century Civil Society.

History

The Civil Society Coordination 2.0 was coined by Chika Sylva-Olejeme, Founder of the Center for Diplomacy and Development (CDD) and proponent of the Oxford-Nigeria Training and Research Project,  the term  was first used in the context of Politics and Government on the Facebook page of Patience Jonathan Institute for Creativity and Entrepreneurship.

“It is our duty to monitor, evaluate and direct the activities of our governments 
It is our duty to ensure that governments provides adequate mentoring for their citizens 
Our method is “Government Mentoring and Monitoring System (GMMS)”
Our platform will be the Mentorship Advocate (MA) website; created and managed by the Civil Society Coordination 2.0”

Key principle

The importance Civil Society Coordination 2.0 is based on the Key principle that large groups of people are smarter than an elite few, no matter how brilliant, organised groups of people are better at solving problems, fostering innovation, coming to wise decisions, even predicting the future. It is perceived that some emerging Government policies are leveraging on the social web, it might be considered as a successful type of community organizing

Governance and transparency

Civil Society Coordination 2.0 is playing a remarkable role in Governance and transparency, Nations of the world are yielding to its dictates. Examples of Civil Society Coordination 2.0 influence and control  include the official government presence in social networking sites, blogs,  and  video sharing sites,

See also
Community organizing
List of social networking websites
List of social bookmarking websites

References
http://www.facebook.com/pages/Patience-Jonathan-institute-for-Creativity-and-Entrepreneurship/296961750317653

Civil society
Social networks for social change